René Barth (born 5 September 1963) is a Swiss handball player. He competed at the 1984 Summer Olympics and the 1996 Summer Olympics.

References

1963 births
Living people
Swiss male handball players
Olympic handball players of Switzerland
Handball players at the 1984 Summer Olympics
Handball players at the 1996 Summer Olympics
Place of birth missing (living people)